Castle Dore is an Iron Age hill fort (ringfort) near Fowey in Cornwall, United Kingdom located at . It was probably occupied from the 5th or 4th centuries BC until the 1st century BC. It consists of two ditches surrounding a circular area  in diameter. Excavated in the 1930s, it is one of the most intensively investigated Iron Age hillforts in Cornwall.

Description and history

The perimeter of Castle Dore consists of two ditches (bivallate). The ramparts (earth banks just inside the ditch) were raised later in the fort's history – from  – the layout remained mostly the same aside from the entrance which was made more complex.

Archaeologist Ralegh Radford led excavations at Castle Dore between 1936 and 1937. Five decades later, the work still represented the most intensive investigation of a hillfort in Cornwall. At the time of Radford's work, archaeologists tended to concentrate on the defences in the course of examining hillforts; Radford, however, investigated the interior and found postholes belonging to huts of at least two distinct phases of occupation.

Radford's initial interpretation was that the fort had been reoccupied in the 5th and 6th centuries AD; however, later reinterpretation based on a greater understanding of post-Roman archaeology concluded that the occupation at Castle Dore was restricted to the Iron Age. The use of radiocarbon dating at other sites lead to greater understanding of the contexts within which Iron Age pottery was found. The dating of the first phase of activity at Castle Dore was revised from the 2nd century BC to the 5th or 4th centuries BC.

During the English civil war, the final defeat of Essex's army was witnessed at the site. On 31 August 1644, whilst attempting a retreat from Lostwithiel to Fowey, Essex was forced to draw up his baggage train and remaining guns within the fort. Just before nightfall one regiment disbanded in disorder signalling impending surrender or death. By morning it was clear that his demoralised soldiers could not be trusted and Essex chose to flee.

See also

Castle Dor, a 1942 historical novel by Daphne du Maurier (1961)
Castle an Dinas, St. Columb Major
Prideaux Castle

References
Notes

Bibliography

Further reading

Hill forts in Cornwall
Iron Age Britain
Locations associated with Arthurian legend
Iron Age sites in Cornwall
Military history of Cornwall